Dikmen is a village in the District of Serik, Antalya Province, Turkey.

History
The village was established by the immigrants of post 1877-1878 Russo-Turkish War from Ottoman Thessaly state, Yenisehir town. Yörük people also settled in the village after they stopped living a nomadic lifestyle.

Geography
Dikmen is located 25 km away from Antalya city center, 13 km from Serik district, 2 km from Kadriye municipality, 3 km from Antalya-Serik land route.

Population

References

Villages in Serik District